OKTXAR Corner is spot in the Red River that marks the tripoint of Oklahoma, Arkansas and Texas. It is likely inaccessible by land, but could be reached by water.  Depending on the river levels, the corner is sometimes located on the sandbanks on the north side of the river, at an approximate elevation of the site is 292 feet above sea level. 

Geography of Bowie County, Texas

See also
 List of Oklahoma tri-points
 OKKAMO Tri-State Marker: monument on the Arkansas-Missouri-Oklahoma tripoint
 Preston Monument: monument on the Colorado-New Mexico-Oklahoma tripoint
 Texhomex: monument on the New Mexico-Oklahoma-Texas tripoint

References